The 2007–08 Elite Women's Hockey League season was the fourth season of the Elite Women's Hockey League (EWHL), a multi-national women's ice hockey league. HC Slavia Praha of the Czech Republic won the league title for the first time.

Final standings

Player statistics

Scoring leaders 
The following players led the league in total points scored at the conclusion of the season.

References

Women
European Women's Hockey League seasons
Euro